Ciarduna is a type of Italian pastry.

Ciarduna siciliana is a traditional sweet pastry from the province of Agrigento, Sicily (Italy). It consists of an almond cookie shell filled with a ricotta filling.

Traditional ingredients
 flour 
sugar
Strutto
vanilla
active yeast
Ammonia Baking Powder (ammonium bicarbonate)
Homogenized milk 
crushed almonds
Cinnamon
icing sugar (when decorating the tops of the ciarduna's)

See also
 List of almond dishes

References

Cuisine of Sicily
Italian pastries
Cheese dishes
Almond desserts